The 1998 Basildon District Council election took place on 7 May 1998 to elect members of Basildon District Council in Essex, England. One third of the council was up for election and the Labour party stayed in overall control of the council.

After the election, the composition of the council was
Labour 23
Liberal Democrats 13
Conservative 6

Election result

All comparisons in vote share are to the corresponding 1994 election.

Ward results

Billericay East

Billericay West

Burstead

Fryerns Central

Fryerns East

Laindon

Langdon Hills

Lee Chapel

Nethermayne

Pitsea East

Pitsea West

Vange

Wickford North

Wickford South

References

1998
1998 English local elections
1990s in Essex